is the short title for a judicial decision of conjoined appeals in the Judicial Committee of the House of Lords in relation to the relevance of continued privity of contract following assignment of property under English contract law.

The cases concerned substantial defective works and whether the assignee who was directly impacted could recover money for this directly (the Linden appeal) and/or the assignor (the original owner) could recover the money by suing the works contractor (the St Martin's appeal). The standard Joint Contracts Tribunal (JCT) contract clause used could, the Court held, legitimately on grounds of public policy somewhat prohibit assignment (that is be subject to its qualified consent to assign the underlying asset, the property). The two potential lines of liability were decided in the negative and in the affirmative respectively. In summary, the first case was not brought by the original owner who commissioned the works (the new owner of the building should have considered the old asbestos contractor in his purchase transaction), the second case was brought by the original owner, still in business, at the behest of the new owner and in a case where both the original parties knew the development would very likely be assigned and relied on by third parties.

Facts
Stock Conversions Ltd, the original lessee of a building, used a JCT standard form contract to hire Lenesta to remove asbestos. Clause 17(1) said "The employer shall not without written consent of the contractor assign this contract." Lenesta subcontracted another firm to do the job. More asbestos was soon found, and a third business was contracted. Then Stock Conversions Ltd assigned the building lease to Linden Gardens, and at the same time, without Lenesta ever having consented, assigning its right of action (against Lenesta) to Linden Gardens. More asbestos was found and Linden Gardens sued the contractors for negligence and breach of contract. The Court of Appeal found the assignment was effective. Lenesta appealed.

In a second joined case, St Martin's Property Corp Ltd ("St Martin's") had been granted a 150-year lease on a site where they commissioned a shop development — in 1974 using the JCT standard contract with clause 17 as in the other conjoined appeal to hire Sir Robert McAlpine as a builder. St Martin's assigned their property interest and the benefits of the contracts to a new owner after the works were completed, without their contractor's consent. Then in 1981 it was found that the building work was defective, and remedial work would cost £800,000. The Court of Appeal by a majority held the assignment was incorrect but that St Martin's was entitled to damages.

Judgment
The House of Lords held that a true construction of clause 17(1) prohibited assignment without consent and that since a party to such a contract might have a genuine commercial interest in ensuring that contractual relations with the party he selected were preserved, there was no reason for holding the contractual prohibition on assignment as being contrary to public policy.

In the second case because the development was, to the knowledge of the parties, very likely to be occupied or purchased by third parties, any defective works damage would accrue to a subsequent owner rather than the original developer. Because of the specific contractual provision that rights of action were not assignable without the defendants' consent, the parties could properly be treated as having entered into the contract on the basis that the first claimants would be entitled to enforce against the defendant's contractual duties on behalf of all those third parties who would suffer from defective performance of the contract but were unable to acquire rights under it, subject to causation, limitation periods and quantum. Accordingly, the first plaintiffs were entitled to substantial damages for any breaches of the contract by the defendants.

Lord Browne-Wilkinson adapted the concept of Lord Diplock in The Albazero that there is an exception applicable to contracts of carriage: "that the consignor may recover substantial damages against the shipowner if there is privity of contract between him and the carrier for the carriage of goods; although, if the goods are not his property or at his risk, he will be accountable to the true owner for the proceeds of his judgment."

See also

English contract law

References

English contract case law
1993 in British law
1993 in case law
House of Lords cases